Motvarjevci (or Szentlászló) is a village in the Municipality of Moravske Toplice in the Prekmurje region of Slovenia, right on the border with Hungary.

References

External links
Motvarjevci on Geopedia

Populated places in the Municipality of Moravske Toplice